Hemicoelus defectus is a species of death-watch beetle in the family Ptinidae.  It is found in North America.

References

Further reading

 
 
 

Bostrichoidea
Beetles described in 1905